Maciej Szmatiuk (born 9 May 1980) is a Polish former footballer.

Career

Club
In July 2007 he moved to Podbeskidzie Bielsko-Biała on a two-year contract from Koszarawa Żywiec.
In summer 2009 he joined Arka Gdynia on a two-year contract.

In June 2011 he joined GKS Bełchatów on a two-year contract.

References

External links
 

1980 births
Living people
Arka Gdynia players
Piast Gliwice players
Ekstraklasa players
Polish footballers
GKS Bełchatów players
Górnik Łęczna players
Gwardia Koszalin players
Sportspeople from Gliwice
Association football defenders